Olaf Koschnitzke (born 12 September 1966) is a German wrestler. He competed in the men's Greco-Roman 90 kg at the 1988 Summer Olympics.

References

External links
 

1966 births
Living people
German male sport wrestlers
Olympic wrestlers of East Germany
Wrestlers at the 1988 Summer Olympics
People from Grevesmühlen
Sportspeople from Mecklenburg-Western Pomerania